The Eleventh Hour is an American medical drama about psychiatry starring Wendell Corey, Jack Ging and Ralph Bellamy, which aired for 62 episodes on NBC from October 3, 1962, to April 22, 1964.

Plot

Cast
Wendell Corey as Dr. Theodore Bassett (season 1)
Ralph Bellamy as Dr. L. Richard Starke (season 2)
Jack Ging as Dr. Paul Graham

Guest stars

 Philip Abbott
 Neile Adams
 Eddie Albert
 Lola Albright
 Frank Aletter
 Richard Anderson
 Edward Andrews
 Edward Asner
 Frankie Avalon
 Phyllis Avery
 Martin Balsam
 Joanna Barnes
 Herschel Bernardi
 Charles Bickford
 Bill Bixby
 Beau Bridges
 Lloyd Bridges
 Lloyd Bochner
 Richard Bull
 Paul Burke
 Red Buttons
 James T. Callahan
 Joseph Campanella
 Mary Grace Canfield
 Diahann Carroll
 Veronica Cartwright
 Linden Chiles
 James Coburn
 Michael Constantine
 Noreen Corcoran
 Patricia Crowley
 Kim Darby
 Colleen Dewhurst
 Bradford Dillman
 Elinor Donahue
 Tony Dow
 Howard Duff
 Dan Duryea
 Andrew Duggan
 Keir Dullea
 Jena Engstrom
 Linda Evans
 Shelley Fabares
 Fabian
 Norman Fell
 Anne Francis
 James Franciscus
 Beverly Garland
 Harold Gould
 Don Gordon
 Don Grady
 Dabbs Greer
 Virginia Gregg
 James Gregory
 Harry Guardino
 Eileen Heckart
 Anne Helm
 Peter Helm
 Steven Hill
 Cheryl Holdridge
 Celeste Holm
 Ron Howard
 Kim Hunter
 Diana Hyland
 David Janssen
 Henry Jones
 Katy Jurado
 Noah Keen
 Shirley Knight
 Ted Knight
 Harvey Korman
 Bert Lahr
 Elsa Lanchester
 Robert Lansing
 Angela Lansbury
 Piper Laurie
 Bethel Leslie
 Joanne Linville
 Robert Loggia
 Julie London
 Lynn Loring
 Tom Lowell
 James MacArthur
 Roddy McDowall
 John McGiver
 Barbara McNair
 Scott Marlowe
 Walter Matthau
 Jayne Meadows
 Burgess Meredith
 Dina Merrill
 Vera Miles
 Elizabeth Montgomery
 Bill Mumy
 Alan Napier
 Ed Nelson
 Lois Nettleton
 Leonard Nimoy
 Jeanette Nolan
 Edmond O'Brien
 Carroll O'Connor
 Jerry Paris
 Eleanor Parker
 Michael Parks
 Roger Perry
 Cliff Robertson
 Ruth Roman
 Marion Ross
 Barbara Rush
 Kurt Russell
 Robert Ryan
 Albert Salmi
 Telly Savalas
 George C. Scott
 Jacqueline Scott
 Sylvia Sidney
 Tom Simcox
 Jean Stapleton
 Inger Stevens
 Dean Stockwell
 Maxine Stuart
 Karl Swenson
 George Takei
 Roy Thinnes
 Joan Tompkins
 Franchot Tone
 Rip Torn
 Harry Townes
 Maxine Stuart
 Robert Wagner
 Robert Walker Jr.
 Tuesday Weld
 Fay Wray
 Keenan Wynn

Episodes

Season 1 (1962–63)

Season 2 (1963–64)

Release

Broadcast 
The Eleventh Hour aired on Wednesdays following Perry Como's Kraft Music Hall and Espionage.

Home media 
In June 2016, Warner Archive Collection released The Eleventh Hour- The Complete First Season on Region 1 DVD as a manufacture-on-demand (MOD) release.

See also
 Breaking Point, a similar television series

References

External links 
 

1962 American television series debuts
1964 American television series endings
1960s American drama television series
1960s American medical television series
Black-and-white American television shows
NBC original programming
English-language television shows
Television series by MGM Television